The surname Orrico may refer to:

 Carmine Orrico, original name of American actor John Saxon (born 1935)
 Corrado Orrico (born 1940), Italian football coach
 Jorge Orrico (born 1946), Uruguayan politician, actor and lawyer
 Miguel Orrico de los Llanos, Mexican politician, Governor of Tabasco (1955-1958)
 Nathalia Goyannes Dill Orrico (born 1986), Brazilian actress better known as Nathalia Dill
 Stacie Orrico (born 1986), American Christian pop singer and songwriter